Ballycarney is a small village in County Wexford in Ireland. It is located on the R745 regional road on the east bank of the River Slaney. It is centered on All Saints Ballycarney Church of Ireland chapel, which sits on a height overlooking the river.

See also
 List of towns and villages in Ireland

References

Towns and villages in County Wexford